Thiamine monophosphate is a thiamine derivative. It occurs naturally in milk.

References

Organophosphates
Thiazoles
Pyrimidines
Thiamine